This is a list of Tianjin Metro stations organized by line.

Line 1

Line 2

Line 3

Line 4

Line 5

Line 6

Line 8

Line 9

TEDA

References

Tianjin Metro
Tianjin Metro